Darryn Binder (born 21 January 1998) is a South African professional motorcycle racer set to compete in the 2023 Moto2 World Championship for Liqui Moly Husqvarna Intact GP.

Career
Binder was born in Potchefstroom, South Africa. His older brother, Brad Binder, is also a professional motorcycle racer, and competed alongside Darryn in Moto3 in both 2015 and 2016. Binder achieved his best result with first place during this.

In 2022, he moved up into MotoGP with WithU Yamaha RNF MotoGP Team, alongside Andrea Dovizioso.

Following the 2022 Australian motorcycle Grand Prix, Binder announced that he would race in the 2023 Moto2 World Championship for Liqui Moly Husqvarna Intact GP alongside Lukas Tulovic as Binder was unable to secure a seat in MotoGP for 2023.

Career statistics

Grand Prix motorcycle racing

By season

By class

Races by year
(key) (Races in bold indicate pole position, races in italics indicate fastest lap)

References

External links

1998 births
Living people
South African motorcycle racers
People from Potchefstroom
Moto3 World Championship riders
White South African people
MotoGP World Championship riders
RNF Racing MotoGP riders
21st-century South African people